Maria C. Yang is an American mechanical engineer whose research concerns engineering design. She is Gail E. Kendall (1978) Professor of Mechanical Engineering at the Massachusetts Institute of Technology (MIT), Associate Dean of Engineering at MIT, faculty academic director of the MIT D-Lab, and associate director of the MIT Morningside Academy for Design.

Education and career
Yang is originally from West Lafayette, Indiana, where her father, Chinese-American aerospace engineer Henry T. Yang, worked as a professor at Purdue University. She majored in mechanical engineering at the Massachusetts Institute of Technology, graduating in 1991. Next, she went to Stanford University for graduate study in mechanical engineering, supported by a NSF Graduate Fellowship. She earned a master's degree in 1994 and completing her Ph.D. in 2000. Her dissertation, Retrieval of informal information from design: A thesaurus based approach, was supervised by Mark Cutkosky.

After postdoctoral research at the California Institute of Technology, industrial work as director of design at Reactivity, Inc., and a faculty position as assistant professor of industrial and systems engineering at the University of Southern California, Yang moved to MIT in 2007, as Robert N. Noyce Career Development Assistant Professor of Mechanical Engineering and Engineering Systems.

Recognition
Yang won a National Science Foundation CAREER Award in 2006. She was elected as an ASME Fellow by the American Society of Mechanical Engineers in 2013. She won the Fred Merryfield Design Award of the American Society for Engineering Education in 2014.

References

External links
Faculty home page

Year of birth missing (living people)
Living people
American mechanical engineers
American women engineers
Massachusetts Institute of Technology alumni
Stanford University alumni
University of Southern California faculty
Massachusetts Institute of Technology faculty
Fellows of the American Society of Mechanical Engineers